Plagianthus betulinus or ribbonwood is a tree that is endemic to New Zealand. One of the distinctive aspects of this tree is that it is usually deciduous which is unusual for New Zealand.

See also
 Plagianthus regius (lowland ribbonwood)
 Flora of New Zealand

External links
The Plagianthus Page

Malveae
Trees of New Zealand